The 2020 Michelin GT Challenge at VIR was a sports car race sanctioned by the International Motor Sports Association (IMSA). The race was held at Virginia International Raceway in Alton, Virginia on August 22, 2020. This race was the fifth round of the 2020 WeatherTech SportsCar Championship, and the fourth round of the WeatherTech Sprint Cup.

The overall race was won by the #3 Corvette Racing team of Antonio García and Jordan Taylor, the duo's third and the team's fourth victories of the season. In GTD, Bill Auberlen collected his record-breaking 61st career IMSA victory, as Turner Motorsport scored their first class victory of the season.

Background
Due to Virginia's COVID-19 gathering restrictions, fans were barred from attendance for the first time this season. The previous three rounds had limited attendance, but the VIR round was the first to outright prevent any fans from entering the grounds. Patrick Pilet and Nick Tandy entered the race as defending champions, although only Tandy participated in the 2020 iteration.

On August 14, 2020, IMSA released the latest technical bulleting, outlining the BoP for the race. In GTLM, the BMW M8 GTE received a five kilogram weight reduction, while the Corvette and Porsche received 20 kilogram weight increases. The Porsche also received a five-liter fuel capacity increase. In GTD, the Audi received a 20 kilogram weight reduction, while the Lexus (which had won the previous three events) had 15 kilograms of ballast added to its total weight.

Entries

A total of 20 cars took part in the event, split across two classes. 6 were entered in GTLM, while 14 were entered in GTD. The lone change from the previous round was the return of Paul Miller Racing's Lamborghini Huracan, which had been absent since the opening race at Daytona.

Qualifying
Frédéric Makowiecki scored overall pole for Porsche GT Team, while Compass Racing's Corey Fergus started first in GTD.

Qualifying results

Results

References

External links

2020 WeatherTech SportsCar Championship season
2020 in sports in Virginia
August 2020 sports events in the United States